Ormocerus dirigoius is a species of stingless wasp. It is native to Maine, United States. It is likely a parasitoid of an oak gall wasp in the family Cynipidae. This species was found in bi-catch of samples collected for another research project.

References

Insects described in 2017
Pteromalidae